Skidmore Cliff is an irregular east-facing cliff, 4 nautical miles (7 km) long, located at the extremity of a spur trending eastward from Saratoga Table, in the Forrestal Range, Pensacola Mountains, Antarctica.

It was mapped by United States Geological Survey (USGS) from surveys and U.S. Navy air photographs during 1956–66. It was named by the Advisory Committee on Antarctic Names (US-ACAN) for Donald D. Skidmore, an ionospheric scientist at Ellsworth Station, during the winter of 1957.

Sources 
 

Cliffs of Queen Elizabeth Land